The Canadian federal budget for fiscal year 1968-1969 was presented by Minister of Finance Edgar Benson in the House of Commons of Canada on October 22, 1968. It was the first federal budget under the premiership of Pierre Trudeau.

External links 

 Budget Speech

References

Canadian budgets
1968 in Canadian law
1968 government budgets
1968 in Canadian politics